Shakur Akbarnejad (born 1960) is an Iranian reformist politician.

Akbarnejad was born in Tabriz. He is a member of the 8th Islamic Consultative Assembly from the electorate of Tabriz, Osku and Azarshahr with Alireza Mondi Sefidan, Masoud Pezeshkian, Mohammad Hosein Farhanghi, Reza Rahmani and Mohammad Reza Mirtajodini.

References

Politicians from Tabriz
Deputies of Tabriz, Osku and Azarshahr
Living people
1960 births
Members of the 8th Islamic Consultative Assembly
Executives of Construction Party politicians
Volunteer Basij personnel of the Iran–Iraq War
Islamic Revolutionary Guard Corps personnel of the Iran–Iraq War
Iranian politicians with disabilities
Iranian city councillors
21st-century Iranian politicians